("Morning Star") is a 2012 Japanese drama film directed by Ryohei Yoshino. Romi Park, previously known primarily for voice acting for anime, performed in her first live-action role. The plot centers on Parks' character, who is a mother disturbed by the disappearance of her husband, and focuses on her relationship with her young son as she becomes drawn into a cult-like religious group.

Cast
Romi Park
Aren

References

Japanese drama films
2012 drama films
2012 films
2010s Japanese films